Jani Radebaugh is an American planetary scientist and professor of geology at Brigham Young University who specializes in field studies of planets. Radebaugh's research focuses on Saturn's moon Titan, Jupiter's moon Io, our own Moon, Mars and Pluto. Radebaugh is a Science Team member of the Dragonfly (spacecraft) mission to Titan, the IVO Io mission proposal, and the Mars Median project. She was an Associate Team Member of the Cassini-Huygens RADAR instrument from 2008 to 2017, and was a graduate student scientist for Io for the Galileo mission. She does science outreach through her work as an expert contributor to the Science/Discovery program How the Universe Works and other television and radio programs.

Career 

Radebaugh received a BS from Brigham Young University in Physics and Astronomy and a PhD from the University of Arizona in Planetary Science. She has been a professor of Geological Sciences at Brigham Young University since 2006 (full professor since 2019). She has conducted field research in terrestrial locations as Earth analogues for geological features on other worlds within the solar system, including the Saharan, Arabian and Namib deserts to study giant sand dunes similar to those on Saturn's moon Titan, lava lakes in the Ethiopian Afar valley, Vanuatu, and Kilauea as analogues for the active lava lakes of Jupiter's moon Io. She traveled to Iran's Lut Desert to study wind-carved ridges, termed yardangs, which are found on Mars, Venus and Titan and has spent four seasons (05-06, 08–09, 13–14, 16–17) in Antarctica with the U.S. Antarctic Search for Meteorites, where she helped recover meteorite samples from around the solar system including the Moon and Mars.

She has analyzed data from the Cassini RADAR instrument and contributed to the formulation of the Dragonfly rotorcraft lander mission proposal. She was also involved in the Galileo Mission, the Io Volcanoes Observer mission proposal, and the Median project for Mars.

Radebaugh has appeared as an expert contributor on several television programs including the Science/Discovery series How the Universe Works, as well as other on BBC and Nova. Radebaugh has appeared on the Science Channel's, The Planets and Beyond.

Personal life 
Radebaugh lives in Provo, Utah and is a member of the Church of Jesus Christ of Latter-day Saints. She was married in 2020.

Inclusion 
In November 2018, Radebaugh was quoted in an article in response to the American Geophysical Union (AGU) action on removing a Brigham Young University job posting due to homophobic bias by the university's hiring code of conduct. Radebaugh supported the hiring advertisement's inclusion on AGU job boards, stating that ideological diversity was important towards a constructive dialogue about inclusion in science.

References

External links 
 BYU Official Profile Page
 Jani Radebaugh at TEDxBYU
 Jani Radebaugh at IMDb
 
BYU Forum Address: We Explore So That We May Discover

Women planetary scientists
21st-century American geologists
Brigham Young University faculty
Living people
Year of birth missing (living people)
American Latter Day Saints
Planetary scientists